WFUZ (1240 kHz) is an AM radio station in Wilkes-Barre, Pennsylvania. It simulcasts the classic rock radio format of WEZX in Scranton, filling in the gaps in WEZX's signal outside Lackawanna County. It is owned by Times-Shamrock Communications of Scranton.

History
WFUZ is the oldest radio station in northeast Pennsylvania, founded as WBAX on April 29, 1922 by John H. Stenger Jr. WFUZ is also the fifth-oldest station in Pennsylvania and tied for being the 60th-oldest station in the U.S. WFUZ has been on the air continuously for over 94 years. It originally broadcast on a frequency of 833 kHz, the common local broadcast frequency used in 1922. By 1925, the station changed frequency to 1170 kHz. In 1928, WBAX changed frequencies to 1200 kHz, which it shared with Wilkes-Barre's other station, WBRE. The time-sharing arrangement between WBAX and WBRE ceased by 1930 when WBAX moved to 1210 kHz and WBRE moved to 1310 kHz. WBAX stayed at 1210 kHz until the great nationwide frequency reassignment mandated by the Federal government took place in 1941 moving the station to its current dial position of 1240 kHz. WBAX was an affiliate of the Mutual radio network during its early history and for a period of time in the 1970s and 1980s was owned by Merv Griffin Group Radio.

In 1994, the Lynett family of Scranton, publishers of The Scranton Times (now The Times-Tribune), bought WBAX and turned it into a full simulcast of WEJL. Although WEJL's daytime signal decently covers Wilkes-Barre, much of the southern part of the market (for instance, Hazleton) gets only a grade B signal due to the area's rugged terrain. At night, WEJL must power down to 32 watts, effectively limiting its nighttime coverage to Lackawanna County.

The station changed its call sign to WQFM on October 1, 2018, then to WFUZ on December 28, 2020.

As of December 2021, WFUZ switched to a simulcast of classic rock-formatted WEZX 106.9 FM Scranton.

References

External links
FCC History Cards for WFUZ
WFUZ official website

FUZ (AM)
Classic rock radio stations in the United States
Radio stations established in 1922
1922 establishments in Pennsylvania
Radio stations licensed before 1923 and still broadcasting